Mohamed Meridja (born 19 September 1960) is an Algerian judoka. He competed in the men's lightweight event at the 1988 Summer Olympics.

References

External links
 
 
 
 

1960 births
Living people
Algerian male judoka
Olympic judoka of Algeria
Judoka at the 1988 Summer Olympics
Place of birth missing (living people)
21st-century Algerian people
African Games medalists in judo
Competitors at the 1987 All-Africa Games
African Games gold medalists for Algeria
20th-century Algerian people